Ivan Filippovich Yankovsky (born October 30, 1990) is a Russian actor, best known for his role in Rag Union. His father is actor/director Filipp Yankovsky, and his grandfather was the actor Oleg Yankovsky.

Early life and education
Ivan Yankovsky was born in Moscow, Russian SFSR, Soviet Union. Ivan's parents are actor and director Filipp Yankovsky and actress Oksana Fandera. Younger sister Elizaveta is also an actress.

From the 8th grade he studied at the Moscow International Film School, after which he entered GITIS. In 2013 he graduated from the acting and directing department (workshop of Sergey Zhenovach).

Personal life.

Since 2014, he had been in a relationship with Vera Kincheva, the daughter of Konstantin Kinchev. In 2020, the couple broke up.

Since 2020, Ivan Yankovsky has been in a relationship with actress Diana Pozharskaya. On June 26, 2021, in Moscow, their son was born, who was named after Ivan’s famous grandfather—the legendary Russian actor Oleg Yankovsky.

Career
His cinematic debut was at the age of 10 in the film Come Look at Me (2001). And the first success and recognition among the public came to him after the role of Andrei Kalyaev in the picture "Indigo" (2008), which told the story of people with superpowers. In particular, the hero of Ivan Yankovsky can anticipate danger and other events.

He starred in the film Rag Union (2015) by director Mikhail Mestetskiy. According to Ivan Yankovsky, he can easily relate to the character he created on screen: This character is not frivolous - he is ideological, he collects and leads everyone, but when he realizes that all this does not make sense and that it is better to enter the institute, he decides: "Let's cancel everything". It is also close to me, this self-flagellation and soul-searching, which is innate for him.

In 2015 he won a prize for "Best Actor" (together with Vasily Butkevitch, Aleksandr Pal and Pavel Chinarev) for the film Rag Union at the XXVI Open Russian Film Festival "Kinotavr".

Among his other successful roles was Pasha Smolnikov in the Russian fantasy film Guardians of the Night (2016). His hero is a courier who works in the department of fighting werewolves and witches. As the actor noted, about working on the role in Guardians of the Night, in which there are many different tricks, his good physical preparation helped him: "I can for example hang and freeze up in the air upside down for a long time".

In the thriller picture The Queen of Spades (2016), his character is Andrei, a young singer of an opera company, who yearns to get the role of Hermann in The Queen of Spades, which is his chance to become famous. Experienced woman and opera diva Anna decides to take advantage of his desire. She begins a fierce game with the participants of the play.
For the work in the film The Queen of Spades (2016), the actor received the prize for the best male lead actor at the Golden Eagle awards.

Selected filmography

References

External links
 

1990 births
Living people
Russian people of Polish descent
Russian male child actors
Russian male film actors
Russian male television actors
Russian male stage actors
21st-century Russian male actors
Male actors from Moscow